Bangyal, a tribe of Jats or Rajputs found principally in the Jammu region of Jammu and Kashmir, India and the Potohar region of Punjab, Pakistan.

References

Social groups of Jammu and Kashmir
Tribes of Rawalpindi District